The 2016 Metro Manila Film Festival (MMFF) is the 42nd edition of the annual Metro Manila Film Festival held in Metro Manila and throughout the Philippines. It is organized by the Metropolitan Manila Development Authority (MMDA). This is the first time that the festival committee required producers to submit either picture lock versions or finished films, instead of screenplays in previous editions. During the festival, no foreign films are shown in Philippine theaters (except IMAX, 4D, and large format 3D theaters), however there are some non-MMFF entries like The Super Parental Guardians, and Enteng Kabisote 10 and the Abangers shown on SM Cinema branches.

The festival began with the traditional Parada ng mga Artista (Parade of Stars) on December 23, 2016. The float parade started from Bonifacio Shrine to Plaza Miranda in Manila.
Regular showing of the 8 full-feature movies and 8 short films happens from December 25, 2016 until January 7, 2017 in major cinemas across Metro Manila and other parts of the country. The Gabi ng Parangal (Awards Night) occurred on December 29, 2016 in Kia Theatre.

In the awards night, the film Sunday Beauty Queen won the Best Picture award, the first documentary film to receive the top honor. EJK won the Best Short Film, while Seklusyon garnered the most major awards in the festival, with 8 awards including the Best Director award for Erik Matti.

The television coverage of the Parade of Stars and the Awards Night was produced by Viva Entertainment and it was shown via delayed basis on IBC-13.

The festival serves as the first MMFF edition under the leadership of MMDA General Manager and MMFF Overall Chairman Thomas Orbos.

Launch and reform

The 2016 Metro Manila Film Festival was formally launched on June 28, 2016 at the SMX Convention Center. It was announced that there would be major changes from the previous edition such as the criteria of choosing the final 8 films to be shown, and the awarding.

A grand launch for the film festival dubbed as "Countdown to MMFF 2016" took place on December 3, 2016 at the SM North EDSA Skydome. The MMFF Awards Night (Gabi ng Parangal) was later announced to take place in December 29, 2016, instead of January 8, 2017, the last day of the MMFF.

In the latter half of December 2016, it was announced that the 2016 MMFF will last until January 3, 2017 instead of January 8. The run will be four days shorter than the run of the last 16 editions of the film festival. Previous editions lasted 14 days and as of the 2015 edition an Implementing Rules and Regulation sets an "extended" run for the film festival until January 7. The decision to shorten the run of the MMFF was made by the executive committee citing that the executive order by Imelda Marcos mandates that the ending date of the film festival should be on January 3. But due to public demand, the MMDA has asked the owners of theaters scattered around malls in the country to extend the film showing of the 8 movies of the MMFF until January 7, 2017 while foreign films will returns on January 4 2017.   Later that month, the MMFF Executive Committee was successful to extend the screenings of all entries until January 7 in selected cinemas, particularly in SM Supermalls.

Brand image

It was announced in June 2016 that a logo design competition and theme song making competition was to be held. The competitions lasted from July 15 until August 31, 2016.

By September 2016, the winning logo and theme song was announced. Nawruz Paguidopon's Jeepney logo was the winning design among the about 400 entries submitted. The MMFF Executive Committee reasons that the logo was the "simplest but the most iconic logo" among the submitted entries and that it represented the film festival's new vision "CineSama para sa Bagong MMFF". The logo consists of blue and red geometric shapes which portrays an image of a jeepney along with shapes depicting select landmarks of Metro Manila. The winning theme song was "Cinesama Kayo" by Emilyn Ofindo which bested over 13 other entries.

Entries

Feature films

The official list of entries was announced on November 18, 2016. From the 27 entries, 8 were chosen for the festival.

Short films
 Birds – Christian Paolo Lat
 EJK – Bor Ocampo
 Manila Scream – Roque Lee & Blair Camilo
 Mga Bitoon sa Siudad – Jarell Serencio
 Mitatang – Arvin Jezer Gagui
 Momo – Avid Liongoren
 Passage of Life – Renz Vincemark Cruz & Hannah Daryl Gayapa
 Heart’s All Gone – Marlontje
 Sitsiritsit – Brian Spencer Reyes

Parade of Stars
The Film Development Council of the Philippine coordinated with the MMFF organizers described to be "simpler" Parade of Stars than parades of the previous editions. The parade took place in December 23, 2016. "Standard size" vehicles were used instead of grand floats.

The parade began at N. Lopez Street beside the Manila City Hall. The parade convoy passed through Taft Avenue then crossed the Jones Bridge. Quintin Paredes Street in Manila Chinatown, as well as Reina Regente Street, Recto and Rizal Avenues, Fugoso Street, and Quezon Boulevard were also part of the parade route. The parade ended at Plaza Miranda.

Awards

Major awards 
The following are the winners:

Other awards
Male Celebrity of the Night – Ronnie Alonte
Female Celebrity of the Night – Rhian Ramos

Short Film category
Best Picture – EJK by Bor OcampoSpecial Jury Prize – Manila Scream by Roque Lee & Blair CamiloBest Director – Jarell Serencio, Mga Bitoon sa Siudad
Best Screenplay – Mitatang
Best Work for Children – Passage of Life

Multiple awards

Box Office gross
The MMFF Executive Committee announced on December 26, that it has reached the target gross ticket sales during the opening of the festival on December 25, Christmas Day. The MMFF also announced the 4 top-grossing movies during the opening day, in alphabetical order, namely Ang Babae sa Septic Tank 2: #ForeverIsNotEnough, Die Beautiful, Seklusyon and Vince & Kath & James. However, the committee did not disclose the actual box office earnings at that time, since most of the cinemas reportedly didn't submit the full ticket gross reports. According to MMDA Chairman Thomas Orbos, the 2016 edition had grossed only half a billion pesos or half of last year's total gross. The Metro Manila Development Authority was criticized for not releasing official earnings of each film. This led to some film studios releasing their own earnings.

Here are the rankings and overall gross ticket sales as of January 3, 2017:

References

External links
The 42nd Metro Manila Film Festival

Metro Manila Film Festival
MMFF
MMFF
MMFF
MMFF
MMFF
December 2016 events in the Philippines
January 2017 events in the Philippines